The 1961 All England Championships was a badminton tournament held at Wembley, London, England, from 14 to 17 March 1961.

In 1960 Judy Devlin married and returned to the championships as Judy Hashman, her sister Sue Devlin also married and became Sue Peard and decided to represent Ireland, the native country of her father and former men's champion Frank Devlin.

Final results

Results

Men's singles

Section 1

Section 2

Women's singles

Section 1

Section 2

References

All England Open Badminton Championships
All England
All England Open Badminton Championships in London
All England Badminton Championships
All England Badminton Championships
All England Badminton Championships